Raaz (English: The Secret) is an Indian horror film series produced by Mahesh Bhatt and Mukesh Bhatt under the banner of Vishesh Films. The first, third and fourth films were directed by Vikram Bhatt, released in 2002, 2012 and 2016 respectively, and the second film was directed by Mohit Suri released in 2009. The first three films were financial successes but the fourth film failed to perform well at the box office.

Overview

Raaz (2002)

The film starts with a group of college students enjoying a picnic in a beautiful forest in Ooty. One of the girls, Nisha (Mink Brar) in that group, dies after being attacked under mysterious circumstances outside a bungalow in front of the forest. She had attacked her boyfriend too, who, though injured, managed to live on. She was rushed to the hospital, where just before dying, her facial look and voice changed completely for a short while, thus confusing all the attending doctors. Professor Agni Swaroop (Ashutosh Rana), who is supposedly an expert in phenomena involving the unexplained and the supernatural is called by the police to look into the matter. Prof. Swaroop and the police visit the forest at the same place where Nisha was attacked and after investigating from Nisha's boyfriend, Prof. Swaroop declares that she was attacked by a spirit. He further reveals that this spirit has waked for some purpose and it will not stop until that purpose is fulfilled.

The story then turns to Sanjana Dhanraj (Bipasha Basu) and Aditya Dhanraj (Dino Morea) in Mumbai in a business party, where Aditya seems too busy to pay heed to the fact that his wife is longing to talk to him. She snatches the car keys from Aditya's pocket and leaves the party to return home. On her frantic drive home, she hears a voice in her head and loses control of the car. However, miraculously, she escapes the accident unscathed. After her recovery, Sanjana asks her husband for a divorce; Aditya, however, realises his fault and suggests a vacation to work out their problems. He offers Sanjana a trip to any corner of the world for some days and Sanjana chooses to return to Ooty (where their relationship first began) to save their failing marriage. In Ooty they stay in the same bungalow behind which Nisha was attacked. Initially, the couple enjoy their stay at the cottage but soon Sanjana starts experiencing mysterious things, such as hearing a woman screaming in the forest behind the cottage and inexplicable falling of objects. She later learns that their housekeeper's husband, Robert, also used to hear strange voices from the forest, and that he ran from the house in fear once he could bear it no more.

Raaz: The Mystery Continues (2009)

The story starts with an American visiting the Kalindi Temple at night. There he sees the priest of the temple in a horrific state – he had slit his body with a scythe and had written 'Om' on his body. The man, horrified by what he is seeing, flees from there. The story then shifts to a model in her early 20s, Nandita and Tanuja Mirror (Kangana Ranaut) who is in love with Yash, (Adhyayan Suman) a director and host of the reality show "Andhvishwas" a show dealing with various superstitions of two ghosts and tantric voodoos. Yash gifts Nandita an apartment where they start living and they love each other, in the meantime Nandita gets pregnant.

One evening, Nandita encounters Prithvi (Emraan Hashmi), an aspiring artist who is in search of his masterpiece. Prithvi tells Nandita that he made a sketch 4 months ago of a girl, who is actually Nandita. He also shows her a painting where she is lying with her wrist slit. He warns her of any type of danger. Regardless, Nandita accidentally slits her wrist due to an unknown ghostly attack on her in the bathroom. Prithvi saves her and admits her to a hospital. Yash arrives to the hospital and learns about her pregnancy and also her miscarriage due to excessive bleeding. She complains to Yash about Prithvi, and Yash gets him arrested, though he is released later on.

Raaz 3: The Third Dimension (2012)

The story revolves around Shanaya (Bipasha Basu), an ambitious actress who obsesses over her career. In addition, she also has a passionate affair with a handsome director named Aditya (Emraan Hashmi). This all ends when a younger actress, Sanjana (Esha Gupta) makes her film debut. In place of Shanaya, Sanjana comes into spotlight and begins to snatch away her awards. Suddenly, Shanaya seems forgotten and everybody only wants to work with Sanjana. Soon enough, Shanaya sees her career fading away and her envy slowly becomes craziness. She begins to turn to black magic and makes it her goal in life to destroy Sanjana's career and make her the pain of loss.

She seeks help of her uncle sonu (Sunil Dhariwal), a tantrik who helps her to practice black magic and calls upon an evil entity, Tara Dutt (Manish Chowdhary). She asks him to make Sanjana's life a living hell. Tara agrees to help haunt and torture Sanjana until she becomes suicidal. He asks Shanaya to give her a black poison through a person she trusts. Shanaya seduces Aditya to do it for her and whenever he feels guilty, she makes him accept again. Aditya, whose sympathy for Sanjana has turned into love, leaves Shanaya and refuses to listen her any more. Now Shanaya must work on her own to defeat the power of love.

The film delivers the message of – "Some people forget everything and run behind mere fame that gets destroyed by time. They do not know that the only thing that remains is the love that we have not just for ourselves, but also for our co-beings. That when we strive, not for ourselves, but for others, that Raaz (secret) is referred to as Life."

Raaz Reboot (2016)

On January 1, 2016. Rehaan (Gaurav Arora) and Shaina (Kriti Kharbanda) return to Romania after a few years of their marriage. Apparently they lived there when they were unmarried. But when Rehaan got an offer as a Venture Capitalist for the East European Finance Company, Shaina was insistent that he take up the job. Rehaan was reluctant, he had a secret to hide.
On the very first day, while unpacking her luggage, Shaina experiences paranormal activities. Rehaan refuses to believe her. A month later, while on a business trip, Rehaan receives a frantic call from Shaina requesting for help. She is found holed up in a telephone booth in a rural area. Apparently, she had gone there to visit a clairvoyant. And thence, the narrative juggles back and forth as to what plagues them and what leads her to the clairvoyant.
The local priest cannot do much about it. The ghost knows the priest's past. So, a blind Indian student studying psychometry in Romania enters the game. Then, enters Aditya Shrivastava (Emraan Hashmi, Shaina's former boyfriend) to rescue his lady love from the evil spirit. Aditya has some strange premonition about all the events taking place in Shaina's life. He offers to help her to fight the spirit and free his lady love from all the pain she is going through. Although, Shaina does not believe him at first, certain series of events make her believe that the spirit has something to do with her husband Rehaan. She finds out that he is keeping ‘Raaz’ which has now started to haunt their life. And in the end it is found out that Aditya is the real ghost whom Rehaan had killed previously to protect Shaina from his bad intentions.

Principal cast

Raaz
 Dino Morea as Aditya Dhanraj
 Bipasha Basu as Sanjana Dhanraj
 Ashutosh Rana as Professor Agni Swaroop
 Malini Sharma as Malini Malik / Malini Malik [ Evil Spirit Ghost ]

Raaz: The Mystery Continues
 Emraan Hashmi as Prithvi Singh
 Kangana Ranaut as Nandita Chopra
 Adhyayan Suman as Yash Dayal
 Jackie Shroff as Veer Pratap Singh

Raaz 3: The Third Dimension
 Emraan Hashmi as Aditya Arora
 Esha Gupta as Sanjana Krishna
 Bipasha Basu as Shanaya Shekhar

Raaz: Reboot
 Emraan Hashmi as Aditya Srivastava / Aditya Srivastava [ Evil Spirit Ghost ]  
 Kriti Kharbanda as Shaina Khanna
 Gaurav Arora as Rehaan Khanna

Inspirations
The first Raaz was an unofficial adaptation of What Lies Beneath.

Release and revenue

See also
 Murder (film series)

References

External links
 
 
 
 
 
 
 
 
 

Indian film series
2000s Hindi-language films
2010s Hindi-language films
Indian horror films
Horror film series
Raaz films